Elections to Penwith District Council were held on 1 May 2003.  One third of the council was up for election and the council stayed under no overall control. Overall turnout was 37.6%

After the election, the composition of the council was
Liberal Democrat 11
Conservative 10
Independent 8
Others 3
Labour 2

Results

1 Conservative candidate was unopposed.

By ward

References

2003 Penwith election result
Turnout figures
 Ward results

2003 English local elections
2003
2000s in Cornwall